1848 in philosophy

Events 
 Year of Revolutions of 1848.
 February 21 - Karl Marx and Friedrich Engels publish The Communist Manifesto (Manifest der Kommunistischen Partei) in London.

Publications 
 Auguste Comte, A General View of Positivism (Discours sur l'ensemble du positivisme)
 Søren Kierkegaard, The Point of View of My Work as an Author (written)
 Karl Marx and Friedrich Engels, The Communist Manifesto
 John Stuart Mill, Principles of Political Economy

Births 
 February 19 - Constance Jones, English philosopher and logician (d. 1922)
 March 16 - Carveth Read, English philosopher and logician (d. 1931)
 May 11 - Wilhelm Windelband, German philosopher (d. 1915)
 June 14 - Bernard Bosanquet, English philosopher (d. 1923)
 November 8 - Gottlob Frege, German mathematician, logician and philosopher (d. 1925)

Deaths 
 January 1 - Friedrich Karl Forberg, German atheist philosopher and classicist (b. 1770)
 June 7 - Vissarion Belinsky, Russian literary critic and philosopher (b. 1811)
 July 9 - Jaime Balmes, Spanish Catalan Catholic priest and philosopher (b. 1810)
 December 18 - Bernard Bolzano, Bohemian Catholic priest, mathematician and philosopher (b. 1781)
 Alexander Ivanovich Galich, Russian philosopher (b. 1783)

References 

Philosophy
19th-century philosophy
Philosophy by year